The Cimba , also spelled Tjimba, are a remote, Herero-speaking hunter-gatherer people of the Kaokoveld desert in northwest Namibia and southwest Angola, in the mountain ranges bordering the Kunene River. They continue to use stone tools, and use Adenium boehmianum to poison their arrows.

Their Herero neighbors portray them as Herero who have lost their cattle and are therefore impoverished, but they are a distinct people, both culturally and physically. Indeed, physically they seem to be a remnant of an indigenous population of a southern African type—along with the Kwadi, the Kwisi, and the Damara—that are unlike either the San (Bushmen) or the Bantu Herero. The mitochondrial DNA of Tjimba who have been genetically tested is similar to that of Himba, Herero, and Damara, suggesting that they descend (at least maternally) from the same Bantu ancestors.

References

Ethnic groups in Namibia
Stone Age Africa
Hunter-gatherers of Africa